Asura ecmelaena is a moth of the family Erebidae first described by George Hampson in 1900. It is found in Sangihe Islands of Indonesia.

References

ecmelaena
Moths described in 1900
Moths of Indonesia